Notre Dame University–Louaize (NDU) is a private Catholic university  in Zouk Mosbeh, Lebanon, founded as Louaize College for Higher Education in 1978 in cooperation with Beirut University College. The name was changed to its present name on  August 14, 1987, when the President of the Lebanese Republic issued a decree (number 4116), granting the right to operate an independent university. NDU is accredited by NECHE (The New England Commission of Higher Education), and currently ranked 5th in Lebanon, according to its presence on the Web by the Webometrics Ranking of World Universities.

History

Notre Dame University–Louaize (NDU) was founded by the Maronite Order of The Blessed Virgin Mary (OMM). Since its foundation in 1695, the Order's stated goal was to promote education and improve the lives of Lebanese people. In 1978, the Order started a new project and Reverend Bechara Boutros Rahi (a former member of the Order and current Maronite Patriarch) founded, in cooperation with Beirut University College (BUC), now the Lebanese American University (LAU), the Louaize College for Higher Education (LCHE), the nucleus of today's NDU. The legal finalization of this project was the promulgation of Decree 4116 by the President of The Lebanese Republic on August 14, 1987, granting the right to operate an independent university.

Academics
The university adopts the American system of education. Notre Dame University–Louaize offers 76 major fields of study divided between undergraduate and graduate degree programs. Minor degree programs are also available.

All the degrees offered are recognized and accredited by the Lebanese Ministry of Education and Higher Education (MEHE).

Faculties and Schools

 Ramez G. Chaghoury Faculty of Architecture Arts & Design
 Department of Architecture
 Department of Design
 Department of Music
 Faculty of Business Administration & Economics
 Department of Economics
 Department of Accounting and Finance
 Department of Management and Marketing
 Department of Hospitality and Tourism Management
 Faculty of Humanities
Department of English and Translation
Department of Psychology, Education, and Physical Education
Department of Media Studies
Department of Religious, Cultural and Philosophical Studies
 Faculty of Engineering
Department of Civil and Environmental Engineering
Department of Electrical, Computer and Communication Engineering
Department of Mechanical Engineering
 Faculty of Natural & Applied Sciences
Department of Computer Science
Department of Mathematics and Statistics
Department of Physics & Astronomy
Department of Sciences
 Faculty of Nursing & Health Sciences
Department of Nursing and Health Sciences
 Faculty of Law & Political Science
Department of Law
Department of Government and International Relations
 Lifelong Learning Center (LLC)

Research Centers

 Center for Applied Research in Education
 The Lebanese Emigration Research Center
 NDU Press
 Office of International Relations
 Center for Research on Sustainable Development
 The Institute of Lebanese Thought

Campus

Located on a land granted by the Maronite Order of The Blessed Virgin Mary and overlooking the Dog River valley, the Zouk Mosbeh campus of NDU has one of the biggest campuses in Lebanon with a total built area of 34,000 square meters. The Zouk Mosbeh campus is designed to accommodate around 8,000 students.

The first phase of the construction project, completed in the summer of 1997, totaling 100,000 square meters of floor space, accommodates the administration, the library, the museum,  the computer center, the classrooms, the laboratories, and the restaurant. In the present phase, NDU has finished building the faculty residences, student dormitories, theater, and parking areas.

NDU has two other campuses: North Lebanon Campus (NLC) in Barsa, El Koura, and the Shouf Campus (SC)  in Deir el-Kamar, Shouf.

NDU Libraries
The NDU Libraries consist of the Mariam and Youssef Library at the Zouk Mosbeh Campus, the NLC Library at the Barsa Campus, the Shouf Library at the Deir El-Kamar Campus and the School of Continuing Education (SCE) Library at the Old Zouk Mosbeh Campus. The NDU Libraries are also responsible for maintaining and developing the research collections of the Benedict XVI Endowed Chair (BSEC) Library, the Center for Applied Research in Education (CARE) Library, the Institute for Lebanese Thought (ILT) Library, the Lebanese Francophonie Literature (LFL) Collection, the Lebanese Research Center for Migration and Diaspora Studies (LERC) Library, the Marian Studies Collection (MSC), and the Ramez G. Chagoury, Faculty of Architecture, Arts & Design (RC-FAAD) Room for Inspiration/Information/Ideas.

Recognizing that the library is central to fulfilling the mission of the University, the NDU Libraries keep up-to date with the latest publications relevant to the major programs of study through purchases and an active local and international gifts and exchange program. Specifically, the NDU Libraries welcome and encourage donations and institutional exchanges that support the University’s academic programs and the scholarly, teaching, and research interests of the NDU community. Consequently, the NDU Libraries provide access to a continuously expanding collection of core reference and circulating materials in print, manuscript, electronic, audio, visual, cartographic, and other appropriate formats. NDU Libraries materials may be requested and borrowed from any campus library, regardless of where they are housed, and all NDU Libraries collections are searchable from the library homepage which is accessible from the quick links on NDU’s website (http://www.ndu.edu.lb).

Furthermore, as a founding member of the Lebanese Academic Library Consortium (LALC) and the Lebanese Inter-library loan and Document delivery services Consortium (LIDS), the NDU Libraries actively collaborate with other Lebanese Libraries to increase access to high-quality information resources for our user communities. In addition, as a member of OCLC's WorldShare Interlibrary Loan community (OCLC symbol: LENOT) the NDU Libraries have joined with many other libraries worldwide to share resources for the benefit of all.

The NDU Libraries are open to all users, however, only NDU faculty, students, staff, and alumni are currently granted borrowing privileges. NDU Libraries guests and visitors are allowed to access and use the library’s resources within the confines of the library only.

International Memberships
The university is a member of:
 Action Chrétienne en Orient, Strasbourg, France.
 Association of Catholic Colleges and Universities, Washington D.C., USA.
 Association of International Educators, Washington D.C., USA.
 Association Internationale des Universités, Paris, France.
 Comunità delle Università Méditerranée, Bary, Italy.
 Council of Independent Colleges, Washington D.C., USA.
 Fédération Internationale des Universités Catholiques, Paris, France.
 Federation of Arab Universities, Amman, Jordan.
 The College Board, USA.
 The American Association of Collegiate Registrar's and Admissions Officers (AACRAO)
 The Association of International Education (NAFSA), USA.
 The European Association of International Education (EAIE)]
In addition, the Faculty of Business Administration and Economics is a member of the European Council for Business Education, Brussels, Belgium.

International Film Festival
Each November the university celebrates a promotes young filmmakers with a screening of their short films. The festival accepts fiction, documentaries and animated short films.

References

Further reading

External links
Notre Dame University-Louaize
Maronite Order of The Blessed Virgin Mary

Notre Dame University–Louaize
Educational institutions established in 1987
1987 establishments in Lebanon
Catholic universities and colleges in Lebanon